Hirden (the hird) was a uniformed paramilitary organisation during the occupation of Norway by Nazi Germany, modelled the same way as the German Sturmabteilungen.

Overview
Vidkun Quisling's fascist party Nasjonal Samling frequently used words and symbols from the old Norse Viking era. During the Second World War, membership was compulsory for all Nasjonal Samling members. In total, about 8,500 Norwegians were members of Hirden during the war. The organisation was dissolved after the liberation, and many of its former members were prosecuted and convicted for treason and collaboration.

History
During the German occupation Hirden got a more military slant. The intention was that it should form the nucleus of a future Norwegian Nazi army, and a "hirdmarine" (Hirden navy) and a "Hirdens flykorps"(Hirden's air force corps) were created in 1942 in addition to the real Hirden, Rikshirden. However, many Hirden members volunteered to Norwegian military units in the war on Nazi German side or served as guards in the various prison camps. Hirden had a broad mandate to conduct operations against dissidents, independent of all police authorities, many of which included the use of violence.

A 2014 Dagsavisen article said that "8 of 10” prisoners “died in the prison camps where Hirden performed guard duty under the leadership of SS".

List of Hirden branches

Main Hirden organisations

Related organisations not directly subject to the Rikshirden

Youth organisations with Hirden names

Gallery

Ranks and rank insignia

See also
Beisfjord massacre
Legal purge in Norway after World War II

References

Sources 
Eirik Veum: Nådeløse nordmenn - Hirden, Kagge Forlag, Oslo 2013,

External links 

Her er Eirik Veums liste over de 20 verste torturistene i Hirden: [Here is Erik Veum's list of the 20 worst torturers in Hirden] 

Norway in World War II
Nasjonal Samling
Paramilitary organisations based in Norway
Norwegian collaborators with Nazi Germany
Organizations established in 1940
Organizations disestablished in 1945
1945 disestablishments in Norway
Organisations based in Oslo
Fascist organizations
Military wings of fascist parties